Tello Alfonso of Castile (1337 – October 1370) was the seventh of the ten illegitimate children of Alfonso XI of Castile and Eleanor of Guzman.  He was a prince of Castile and First Lord of Aguilar de Campoo.  In Spanish he is known as Tello de Castilla, Infante de Castilla; Señor de Aguilar de Campoo, de Vizcaya, de Castañeda y de Lara.

Biography
He was born in Seville. He participated along with his brothers in the struggles against the despotic rule of his half-brother Pedro of Castile also known as Pedro the Cruel.

Family
In 1353 he married Juana of Lara (daughter of Juan Núñez III de Lara), but she was reportedly murdered in 1359, on orders of King Peter (Pedro the Cruel). Tello and Juana had no legitimate children. It is reported that Tello kept the news of her death secret in order to maintain possession of her dowry.

Tello had many illegitimate children.
Juan Tellez de Castilla, Segundo Señor de Aguilar de Campoo, (1355-1385). He died at the Battle of Aljubarrota. From his marriage to Leonor Lasso de la Vega arised the Marquesses of Aguilar de Campoo (Grandees of Spain).
Afonso Tellez de Castilla, b. 1365
Pedro Enríquez de Castilla, Señor de Camporredondo, b. 1370
Fernando Tellez de Castilla
Constanza Tellez de Castilla
Maria Tellez de Castilla
Isabel Tellez de Castilla
Juana Tellez de Castilla
Leonor Tellez de Castilla

Ancestors

References

1337 births
1370 deaths
People from Seville
Lords of Spain
Sons of kings